Susanna Watts (1768–1842) was a noted English abolitionist, author, translator and artist.

Biography
Watts was born in 1768, in Danet's Hall, Leicester, the youngest of three sisters and the only child of John and Joan Watts to survive childhood. Her family was left impoverished after her uncle (who had supported the family after Watts' father died when she was 15 months old), died when she was 15. Watts took up writing in order to earn money to support herself and her mother. Her poetry was noted for its anti-slavery themes.

Watts published a poem directed at William Wilberforce criticising his views on women working in the abolitionist movement. Despite Wilberforce's views, Watts and her friend Elizabeth Heyrick continued campaigning against slavery, including founding The Humming Bird, the first anti-slavery periodical. Heyrick and Watts would visit greengrocers and other businesses to encourage the owners to not purchase Caribbean sugar and other products produced by slave labour.

Watts published a number of translations, collections of poetry, and travel writing. Upon Heyrick's death in 1834, Watts published a poem To the Memory of Eliizabeth Heyrick. Watts' reputation led to her being noted in Mary Pilkington's Memoirs of Celebrated Female Characters.

She published her guidebook A Walk Through Leicester anonymously, and referred to herself as 'he' in the address at the beginning of the book.

Watts also founded the philanthropical organisation, Society of the Relief of Indigent Old Age, as well as publishing books on the treatment of animals.

Her scrapbook is now held by the Leicestershire Records Office.

Selected published works
Chinese maxims, translated from The oeconomy of human life, into heroic verse - (Translation) (1784).
The Wonderful Travels of Prince Fan-Feredin, in the Country of Arcadia – (Translation) (1799).
Original Poems and Translations (1802).
A Walk Through Leicester (1804).
The Insects in Council, Addressed to Entomologists, with Other Poems. (1828)
The Animals’ Friend: a Collection of Observations and Facts Tending to Restrain Cruelty, and to Inculcate Kindness towards Animals (1831)

References

1768 births
1842 deaths
People from Leicester
English abolitionists
English non-fiction writers
English translators
English women poets
English women non-fiction writers